Ahmadabad (also Romanized as Aḩmadābād) is a village in Rudbar Rural District, in the Central District of Tafresh County, Markazi Province, Iran. At the 2006 census, its population was 31, in 7 families.

References 

Populated places in Tafresh County